Otradnaya is a rural locality (a stanitsa) and the administrative center of Otradnensky District, Krasnodar Krai, Russia. Population:

References

Notes

Sources

Rural localities in Krasnodar Krai
Otradnensky District